Miroslav Radoman (born 28 February 1958) is a Serbian former football referee and player.

Playing career
After starting out at Njegoš Lovćenac, Radoman played for Vrbas between 1978 and 1990, including six seasons in the Yugoslav Second League.

Refereeing career
Radoman started his refereeing career locally in 1984, while still playing for Vrbas. He later officiated in the First League of FR Yugoslavia/Serbia and Montenegro from 1992 to 2004, becoming one of the country's most successful referees. In addition, Radoman refereed the FR Yugoslavia/Serbia and Montenegro Cup finals on several occasions, lastly in 2004, shortly before retiring.

References

External links
 

1958 births
Living people
People from Brčko District
Serbs of Bosnia and Herzegovina
Yugoslav footballers
Serbian footballers
Association football goalkeepers
FK Vrbas players
Yugoslav Second League players
Yugoslav football referees
Serbian football referees
UEFA Europa League referees
UEFA Champions League referees